Sean Foreman (born August 27, 1985) is an American singer, songwriter and rapper from Boulder, Colorado. He is a member of the electronic pop duo 3OH!3 with Nathaniel Motte.

History 
Sean Foreman was born in Boulder, Colorado and attended Fairview High School. He graduated from University of Colorado Boulder with an English major and math minor. He married his college sweetheart, Melanie Mary Knigge, in 2013.
 
Foreman co-writes all of 3OH!3's music. The duo's second studio album, Want, went gold in 2008. The song "Don't Trust Me" was No. 1 on pop radio and sold over 6 million copies. "Starstrukk", the third single from Want, went platinum and peaked within the top five of the charts in Australia, Belgium, Finland, Ireland, Poland and the United Kingdom. Its radio-only and deluxe album version of "Starstrukk", featuring pop singer Katy Perry, was released along with a music video.
 
3OH!3's lead single from Streets of Gold, "My First Kiss" featuring Kesha, went platinum after selling over 1 million copies. Foreman is an avid book reader and comic book collector, and made his own comic for the Streets of Gold deluxe record.
 
Foreman has worked and written with Lil Jon, Andrew W.K, Katy Perry, Blues Traveler, Icona Pop, Wallpaper, The Summer Set and Karmin. He wrote on Kesha's debut album Animal, and co-wrote her platinum hit, "Blah Blah Blah." He also wrote on Ariana Grande's album Yours Truly, co-writing her ballad "Tattooed Heart", which was performed on the American Music Awards and for the President of the United States.
 
3OH!3's fourth studio album, Night Sports, was released on May 13, 2016 on Fueled By Ramen.

Foreman is a World Champion Ultimate Frisbee player. He won the Junior Gold Medal with Team USA in 2004. He won college nationals in ultimate frisbee in 2004 with CU's Mamabird. Foreman also once rode a bicycle from New York City to Boulder. In 2009, he took the Trans-Siberian Railway in the winter and in 2010, he ran the Chicago marathon for the American Cancer Society.

Discography

3OH!3 
 3OH!3 (2007)
 Want (2008)
 Streets of Gold (2010)
 Omens (2013)
 Night Sports (2016)
 Need (2021)

As a songwriter

Filmography

TV appearances

References

1985 births
Living people
American male musicians
American people of English descent
American electronic musicians
American pop musicians
American male songwriters
Musicians from Boulder, Colorado